St. Bonaventure Church is a church located in Raeville, Nebraska within the Roman Catholic Archdiocese of Omaha. in 1982, the church and associated buildings were added to the National Register of Historic Places.

Description
The school in the complex, designed by Joseph Guth, was built in 1910.  The church, built during 1917–1919, was designed by Jacob M. Nachtigall.  A 1920 rectory is also included.

References

External links

Churches in the Roman Catholic Archdiocese of Omaha
Churches on the National Register of Historic Places in Nebraska
Romanesque Revival church buildings in Nebraska
Colonial Revival architecture in Nebraska
Roman Catholic churches completed in 1910
Buildings and structures in Boone County, Nebraska
Joseph P. Guth buildings
National Register of Historic Places in Boone County, Nebraska
20th-century Roman Catholic church buildings in the United States